Campylotropis is a genus of flowering plants in the legume family, Fabaceae. It belongs to the subfamily Faboideae and consists of a number of species of perennials native to Nepal, China, Korea and Taiwan.

Species

Campylotropis chinensis
Campylotropis diversifolia
Campylotropis drummondii
Campylotropis eriocarpa 
Campylotropis esquirolii
Campylotropis gracilis
Campylotropis hersii
Campylotropis latifolia
Campylotropis meebildii
Campylotropis muehleana
Campylotropis parviflora
Campylotropis polyantha
Campylotropis prainii 
Campylotropis sargentiana
Campylotropis stenocarpa
Campylotropis trigonoclada
Campylotropis wilsonii
Campylotropis yunnanensis

References 

Desmodieae
Fabaceae genera
Taxa named by Alexander von Bunge